Rodney Alejandro is an American musician, composer, arranger, producer and audio engineer raised in Houston, Texas. A product of Houston's inner city neighborhoods, Alejandro grew up in the barrios and ghettos that would enrich his consciousness.  Living on the east side, he tasted all the spices of Salsa music, Tejano and life lessons told through Mariachi music.  Attending schools in Houston's 5th ward, he was heavily influenced by the sweet sounds of soul, intimacy of jazz and hard hits of hip hop. From an early age music was all around, and his diverse influences only help broaden his music appreciation and creative palette.

Early life

(1987–1995) 

Alejandro's professional career began as a senior in high school, with the co-founding of Tejano-pop band Valentino. Valentino was led by David Flores, who departed another Houston band called La Mafia. Alejandro joined the band on keyboards, having taught himself after saving a year to buy his first keyboard, an Ensoniq ESQ-1. He quickly mastered the synthesizer and its capabilities, but his music technique was limited. Texas musician Joel Guzman gave him lessons not only on technique but playing in the Tejano style. Technology was fast becoming the norm in music and Alejandro took the opportunity to learn about MIDI, sequencing, sampling, and other digital technologies available at the time. His keyboard arsenal grew to include an E-mu Emax, Roland R-8 drum machine and a Yamaha C1 music computer, one of the first MS-DOS computers made to run music software. Valentino was known throughout the state as the most electronic band in Tejano, in a genre where traditional instruments of drums, bass, guitars, and accordions were the norm. The band would perform concert using these various technologies, midi sequencing backing tracks, triggering audio samples, and blending electronic pop sounds with the tradition Tejano arrangements. Rodney's reputation grew as a skilled music programmer, and he continued to work on his performance technique. But the calls came to help other artist in their quest to incorporate electronic instruments. Valentino toured in the Tejano circuit with great artist like Little Joe y La Familia, Groupo Mazz, Selena y Los Dinos, La Sombra, and La Mafia to name a few. During these travel he connected with many great musicians and began to collaborate on other projects. A.B. Quintanilla III asked Rodney to come work with Selena contributing arrangement and production services on her song "Amame", on the Entre Mi Mundo project. Tony Guerrero of La Sombra from Chicago, asked Rodney to sequence and program sounds for their projects, and a solo project by the lead singer Gavino Guerrero. Albert "Tiger" Diaz, another singer in the group, recorded a solo project and he too hired Alejandro for arranging and keyboard programing. These relationships would lead to further collaboration many years later.

Valentino continued to perform, but making the crossover to more Latin American pop music market. They performed original bilingual pop songs recorded at Sugarhill Studios in Houston. Traveling to LA, they worked with producers Michael Sembello, and Preston Glass, on demos pursuing a record deal. In 1992, Valentino performed on Buscando Estrellas, the Latin version of the American show Star Search, and won in the band category. "Vamos A Bailar" was a song written by Alejandro, the group used to win with. That trip to LA introduced him to other artist one being Coyote of Ponce, Puerto Rico. Rodney contributed a bi-lingual song called "Mas Dura" to their effort on the American show, Star Search. The band went on to win the season finale and signed to Capitol/EMI Latino. Their first single was "Bien Dura", a full Spanish version of the original bilingual song. Unknowingly, Alejandro became the only songwriter to win Star Search in Spanish and English. In 1992, Valentino signed a record deal with BMG International. Alejandro contributed 8 of the 10 tracks record for the album and project was released in 1993. While in the studio, Rodney met Jamie Glaser, a guitarist who mentioned the value of his Berklee education. Being self-taught in pop music got him only so far, so Rodney set his sights on Berklee College of Music. Upon returning to Houston from LA, Alejandro enrolled at a local community college to pursue his education and music professional goals.

(1995–1997)

Having completed basic requirement course at San Jac Community College, he then transferred to Berklee College of Music in June 1995. Summer semester was his first, carrying a full course load, his objective was to get in and get out. By the end of summer he took a job in the school's work study program. He was assigned to the Berklee Performance Center, where he worked as a stage hand, and later as sound engineer for college functions and various professional concerts. This allowed him to stay and complete a degree program. He chose a dual degree program in music production and engineering and contemporary writing and production. His previous experience in professional music would help him throughout the journey. With each passing semester, he garnered more scholarship funds, and was awarded the Ticketmaster Award for Excellence. 1n 1997, Rodney completed his studies, graduating summa cum laude, and received the Production Scholar of the Year from the MP&E dept. and Outstanding Excellence from the CW&P dept. See Education below for further details.

Career

(1997–2001) 

After graduating, Rodney headed to San Francisco with one connection. During his time at Berklee, he maintain a professional relationship with producer Preston Glass. Preston introduced Rodney to 3x Grammy Winner Narada Michael Walden the previous summer. Landing in SF, Rodney contacted Narada but there was no place for him in his camp at the time. Rodney pursued other avenues and worked as a stage hand to make ends. After 2 months he got a message Narada was now looking for a staff music programmer. Rodney reconnected with Narada and his first assignment to prove himself was a project for Diana Ross. Narada approved of his work and hired Rodney on staff in Oct 1997. During his tenure with Narada Michael Walden, Rodney worked with some of today greatest artist and legends. Sessions include artist and musicians, Ray Charles, Sting, Stevie Wonder, Diana Ross, Sammy Hagar, En Vogue, Tamia, Debelah Morgan, Winans Phase 2, My Town, Jerry Hey, Wyclef Jean, Wild Orchid, Shanice Wilson, Jaci Velasquez, Take 6, Yolanda Adams, and Father Guido Sarducci amongst many others. In 1998, Rodney became a staff producer with Narada, contributing to many recordings as an Associate Producer. Rodney also joined Narada on various live performance events. In which Rodney performed with Stevie Wonder, Chucho Valdez, Sam Moore, Eric Clapton, Lauryn Hill, The Impressions, Jeff "Skunk" Baxter, to name a few. Narada's show of love is giving people nicknames. After a session one day, Rodney acquired the name "Cortada". On every project completed with Narada he is credited with that moniker. It since has been added to various credits though Rodney has been independent since 2001. Highlights from Rodney's time at Tarpon Studios in San Rafael, CA under the super producer Narada Michael Walden.

Tevin Campbell's "Since I Love You" track on album titled TEVIN CAMPBELL released on Qwest/Warner Bros. Records in 1998. Rodney is credited with music programming/arranging.
The Temptations' Phoenix Rising was the group's 1998 release on Motown/Universal Records. Rodney co-wrote "My Love" and "Tempt Me", and contributed keyboards/programming services for the recording. The album spent a total 72 weeks on the Billboard charts, reaching #8 on the R&B/Hip-Hop Albums Chart and #44 on Billboard 200 charts. Phoenix Rising was The Temptations first million selling album in over 20 years. The album was certified platinum on November 15, 1999. The album also garnered a Grammy Nomination in the category of Best Traditional R&B Vocal Performance.
The Temptations' Ear-Resistible released in 2000 on Motown/Universal Records, Rodney contributed as a Keyboardist/Bassist/Programmer/Engineer on the songs "Party" and " Kiss Me Like You Miss Me". The album spent a total 26 weeks on the charts, reaching #16 ON R&B/Hip-Hop Album Charts and #54 on Billboard 200 Charts. Ear-Resistible garnered the group its 3rd Grammy Award in the category of Best Traditional R&B Vocal Performance.
 Winans Phase II We Got Next album released in 1999 on Myrrh Records. Rodney contributed arranging/programming services as well as performing on various instruments. The album spent 64 weeks on the Billboard Gospel Chart reaching a peak at #1. The album also spent time on the R&B/Hip-Hop Albums chart reaching #93 and the Billboard 200 peaking at #168. We Got Next was nominated for a Grammy Award in the category of Best Contemporary Soul Gospel Album.
 "Livin La Vida Mickey" is a compilation of songs for Disney. Rodney produced the artist Myra for her cover version of the Steppenwolf classic "Magic Carpet Ride". Released on Disney Records in 2000, he produced and provided music programming. The compilation album spent 38 weeks on the Billboard Kids Album Charts and reached #1.
 Mytown's debut release on Cherry/Universal Records "Mytown" and released in 2000. Rodney co-wrote and produced "Love Sent Angel". He contributed on keyboards, engineering. and music programming.
 Yoli Tamu's "Ain't No Stoppin' Sunshine" Rodney performed as Associate Producer. The song was use in the film, "Deliver Us From Eva" starring LL Cool J and Gabrielle Union. The movie was released in 2003 by Focus Features. Rodney also contributed as an engineer, musician, music programmer on her album entitle "Breathing Underwater".
 "Now and Again" television show broadcast on CBS. Rodney performed as Associate Producer on the main title called "Gimme A Sign". The show starred Eric Close and Dennis Haysbert.  The show earned 3 Saturn Awards and was Emmy nominated in 2000 for Outstanding Main Title Design.
 Stuart Little soundtrack contains a song by Debelah Morgan entitled "As Long As I Can Dream" Rodney performed as Associate Producer on the track included in the film released in 1999 by Columbia Pictures.
 Yukie Kobayashi on For Life/Sony Records released a single in Japan entitled "Who Do You Love". The song was translated from English to Japanese, and Rodney co-wrote and co-produced the track.

(2001–2009) 

In 2001, Rodney made the move to Los Angeles and officially launched SweetSpot Entertainment, Inc. His company would be the headquarters for all his music production, live performance and music publishing activities. While still cultivating his English music contacts, he began to make new connections for the Spanish music market. He would team up with Claudia Brant, and Nir Seroussi to begin writing for various project. He also worked with Andy Vargas(Santana), Adrianne Gonzalez(The Rescues), Gerard McMahon, Frankie J, Maria Conchita Alonso, Tina Moore, Siedah Garrett, Corbin Blue, Raven-Symoné, Paulina Rubio, Phoebe Snow, Roger Daltrey, Lee Sklar, Michael Landau, The Script, amongst many other artist and provided music for film and TV productions. Here are some highlights from his work with SweetSpot Entertainment, Inc. He also works for The Script, in some way.

(2002) 

 Vocal Director and Engineer- Manuel Romero releases his debut album on WEA International.
 Arranger/Music Programmer- Marta Sanchez's track "Tal Vez Fuiste Tu" on her album entitles Soy Yo was released in Spain on Muxxic Latin/Universal Records. thumb|right
 Keyboards/Music Programmer- Jan is a Latin singer released a track entitled "Passion" on Fonovisa/Univision Records.
 Producer(Pop remix)-Groups La Onda's remix release of "Asereje" on Capital/EMI Latino release A Toda Onda. Certified Gold for 500,000 plus sells on February 11, 2003, by the RIAA.
Songwriter- "Beso A Beso" (Alejandro, Brant, Seroussi) recorded by Olga Tanon for WEA release Sobrevivir. This album spends 19 weeks on Billboard charts, peaking at #10 on Latin Pop Album Chart and #11 on Billboard Latin Album Chart. She also won a Latin Grammy for her work in the category of Best Female Pop Album. On Dec 19, 2002, Sobrevivir was certified platinum for 1,000,000 plus sells by the RIAA.
Composer/Performer/Producer- Main Title for FX Network's hit TV series The Shield. The show won many awards including a Golden Globe for Best Drama Series, a Satellite Award for Best Drama Series, in 2009, it received an Emmy nomination for Best Drama Series and in 2008, awarded the American Film Institutes' Best Television Series.

(2003) 

thumb|left
 Live Performer on keyboards with Roger Daltrey at Music Box Theater, Los Angeles, Phoebe Snow at Sunset Junction Festival, Los Angeles, G Tom Mac various cities, Andy Vargas at Conga Room.
 Keyboards/Music Programmer- on artist Elan's album Street Child, released on AbbyWho Records.
Songwriter/Arranger- "Besame Despacito" & "You Better Love Me"(Alejandro, Claudia Brant, Nir Seroussi) released on Lideres/Universal Latino artist Sandra.
Songwriter-"Mujer(Dulce Veneno)"(Alejandro, Brant) released on RCA artist Juan Antonio's album project Los Que Se Aman.
Songwriter- "Cumbianchera" (Alejandro, Brant) released on Capitol/EMI Latino artist La Onda's album Otra Onda. In 2004, La Onda would win Premio Lo Nuestro in the categories of Best New Artist and Best Tejano Performance.
Producer- "Asi, Asi" pop remix by La Onda on Capitol/EMI Latino release Otra Onda.
Songwriter- "Rompecabezas" sung by Frankie J, on Kumbia Kings Multi-Platinum Album 4. The album spent 53 weeks on Billboard charts reaching #1 on the Latin Album Pop Chart, #33 on R&B/Hip-Hop Album Chart, #53 on Billboard 200 Chart, and won Billboard Latin Pop Album of the Year by Duo or Group.  The album was also Latin Grammy nominated in the category of Mejor Album Vocal Pop Duo o Groupo. In 2004, this project wins a Premio Lo Nuestro for Best Duo or Group in Regional Mexican Category. On November 4, 2004, Kumbia Kings 4 was certified 2× platinum, for 2,000,000 plus sells by the RIAA.

(2004) 

 Songwriter/Producer- "Bombshell" (R.Alejandro, A. Gonzalez) performed by Adrianne Gonzalez for the television series Witchblade soundtrack release on Edge Artist/Top Cow Records.
 Songwriter- "Mucho Mas Mujer" (R.Alejadnro, C.Brant, N.Seroussi) recorded by Melina Leon for her self-titled Sony Music release Melina Leon. The album reached #14 on the Billboard Tropical Album Chart.

References

External links 
 Rodney Alejandro on All Music Guide
 Rodney Alejandro on All Music Guide 2
 
 The Shield  from Sony Pictures Television
 
 SweetSpot Entertainment on YouTube

Living people
American male composers
21st-century American composers
The Shield
Hispanic and Latino American musicians
American musicians of Mexican descent
21st-century American male musicians
Year of birth missing (living people)